American singer Demi Lovato has recorded materials for seven studio albums. Prior to launching her music career, Lovato starred in the Disney Channel musical television film Camp Rock, as well as the film's follow-up Camp Rock 2: The Final Jam.

Once signed with Hollywood Records, Lovato released her debut pop rock single, "Get Back" from her debut studio album, Don't Forget which was released on September 23, 2008. "La La Land" was released as well. Her second studio album, Here We Go Again was released on July 21, 2009. The lead single of the same title was released on June 23, 2009 and the second single, "Remember December" was released on January 18, 2010. She released her third album, Unbroken in September 2011. The album's lead single, "Skyscraper" was released on July 12, 2011. The following single, "Give Your Heart a Break" was released on January 23, 2012. Her fourth album, Demi was released on May 14, 2013. The lead-single of the album, "Heart Attack" was released on February 25, 2013. The album features the singles "Made in the USA", "Neon Lights" and "Really Don't Care".

On July 1, 2015, Lovato released her lead-single from her fifth album, called "Cool for the Summer". Lovato's fifth album, Confident was released on October 16, 2015 and the title track "Confident" was released as a single on September 18, 2015. "Stone Cold", which was released as the album's third and final single, peaked at number 2 on the US Bubbling Under Hot 100 Singles chart. She released a buzz single titled "Body Say" in early July 2016.

In 2017, Lovato was featured in Cheat Codes' "No Promises", Jax Jones' "Instruction" along with Stefflon Don, also Luis Fonsi's "Échame la Culpa". On July 11, 2017, she released the lead single of her sixth studio album, "Sorry Not Sorry". Lovato's sixth album, Tell Me You Love Me was released on September 29, 2017.

In 2018, Lovato released her collaborations with Christina Aguilera and Clean Bandit, titled "Fall in Line" and "Solo", respectively. On June 21, 2018, Lovato released a stand-alone single "Sober", which she referred to as "my truth" and discusses struggles with addiction and sobriety.

In 2020, Lovato made her comeback in the music industry by performing single "Anyone" at the 62nd Annual Grammy Awards. Lovato released singles "I Love Me", "Still Have Me" and "Commander in Chief" in March, September and October, respectively. She also was featured in Sam Smith's collaborative single "I'm Ready", a remix of JoJo's "Lonely Hearts", and Marshmello's "OK Not to Be OK".

Lovato released her seventh studio album, Dancing with the Devil... the Art of Starting Over on April 2, 2021, including singles "What Other People Say" with Sam Fischer and "Dancing with the Devil".

Lovato released her eighth studio album, Holy Fvck on August 19, 2022.

Songs

Unreleased songs

See also
Demi Lovato discography

Notes

References

External links
 Demi Lovato at AllMusic

 
Lovato, Demi